David Marconi is an American screenwriter, film producer and film director. His writing credits include the screenplays for Enemy of the State, Live Free or Die Hard, and The Foreigner.

Filmography
Rumble Fish (1983) (Production Supervisor (Effects Unit))
The Outsiders (1983) (Production Aide)
The Sky's No Limit (1984) (Property Master)
G.I. Joe: A Real American Hero (1986) (Story/Teleplay)
The Harvest (1993) (Director/Writer)
Enemy of the State (1998) (Writer)
Camera (2000) (Cast)
Live Free or Die Hard (2007) (Story)
The Fulfillment (2010) (Writer) 
The Nobistor Affair (2010) (In Development)
Collision (2013) (Director/Writer) 
The Contract (2015) (Story)
The Foreigner (2017) (Writer/Exec. Producer)

References

External links 

American male screenwriters
English-language film directors
American television writers
American male television writers
Living people
American film directors
American film producers
Year of birth missing (living people)